The Auchterarder Creed was the pejorative term given to a declaration formulated by the Church of Scotland presbytery in  Auchterarder in 1717.

The declaration argued that it was unorthodox to teach that one must repent prior to coming to Christ, meaning that the Auchterarder Presbytery saw repentance as a result of being in Christ instead of an instrumental requirement for salvation. The creed was condemned by the General Assembly of the Church of Scotland in 1717, saying that one could only be saved after a person had gotten rid of their sins through repentance. 

The condemnation was opposed by Thomas Boston, who in response recommended the reading of the Marrow of Modern Divinity, having similar doctrines to the Auchterarder. This then resulted in the Marrow being reprinted in Scotland and igniting the Marrow Controversy.

References 
18th century in Scotland
18th-century controversies
History of Christianity in Scotland
Protestantism-related controversies
Church of Scotland